Route 113 is a Connecticut state highway running from the Bridgeport-Stratford town line around the Lordship section of Stratford to the eastern part of the town.

Route description
Route 113 begins at an intersection with I-95 (Exit 30) at the Bridgeport-Stratford town line and heads east into Stratford as Lordship Boulevard. It then heads southeast along the western boundary of Sikorsky Memorial Airport, then turns east, still encircling the airport, along Oak Bluff Avenue and Prospect Drive. The transition between Oak Bluff Avenue and Prospect Drive is a roundabout intersection. Route 113 then heads north around Stratford Point as Stratford Road and Main Street, along the mouth of the Housatonic River at Long Island Sound. The road also provides access to Short Beach Park, a town beach. Main Street continues north towards Stratford center, intersecting with Route 130 and West Broad Street (which provides access to I-95 at Exit 32). Continuing north, it goes under I-95 without an interchange past the Stratford railroad station, intersecting with U.S. Route 1, then running for another  in the residential part of town before ending at Route 110 (East Main Street). Main Street continues straight as Route 110.

History
Route 113 was created in 1932, originally running from Stratford Point to downtown Stratford and then to Shelton along the current route of Route 108. In about 1940, it was extended west along the current route into Bridgeport.  In 1944, it was rerouted to the north of Sikorsky Airport (along Access Road), with the southerly alignment becoming Route 113A, but was returned to its current route in 1947 (Route 113A was deleted). In 1952, it was extended north to the Shelton town center via the Huntington Turnpike. In 1963, Route 108 was extended south along Nichols Avenue and Route 113 was rerouted east to its current route, over a former section of Route 110. This northernmost portion of current Route 113 was the original southern end of Route 8 prior to the construction of the expressway.

Major intersections

References

113
Transportation in Fairfield County, Connecticut
Transportation in Bridgeport, Connecticut
Stratford, Connecticut